Platygillellus altivelis, the Sailfin stargazer, is a species of sand stargazer native to the Pacific coast of Costa Rica and Panama where it can be found on sandy bottoms at depths of from .  It can reach a maximum length of  TL.

References

External links
 Photograph

altivelis
Fish described in 1974
Taxa named by Charles Eric Dawson